The Nisga'a Tribal Council was the governing coalition of the band governments of the Nisga'a people.  It was replaced by the Nisga'a Lisims Government as a result of the signing of the Nisga'a Treaty with Canada and British Columbia.

See also
Nisga'a
Nisga'a Lisims Government

References

Nisga'a
First Nations tribal councils in British Columbia